Makropoulos is a Greek surname, its female form is Makropoulou. Notable people with the surname include:

 Georgiann Makropoulos (1943–2010), American wrestling historian and author
 Georgios Makropoulos (born 1953), Greek chess master and chess official
 Marina Makropoulou

See also
The Makropulos Affair

Greek-language surnames